Kiriteswari Temple is situated in Kiritkona village under the Nabagram CD block in the Lalbag subdivision of Murshidabad district in the state of West Bengal. This is one of the Shakti Pithas among the 51 peeths.

Geography

Location

It is located in Kiritkona village near the bank of Bhagirathi River, in Lalbag subdivision at Murshidabad district.

History
According to the Puranas or Hindu mythology the place were named as Kiriteswari. Peeth devi name is devi Vimala and Bhairab is Samvarta. The construction of the temple is more than 1000 years old and this place was considered to be the sleeping place of Mahamaya. Local people call this temple as Mahishamardini. Devi is also worshipped as Mukuteshwari (as her mukut or crown fell) the Holy Goddess. The original Temple was destroyed in 1405. The present temple was re-constructed by Darpanarayan, king of Lalgola in the 19th century and this is the oldest mark of architecture amongst 51 Peethas. It is the oldest temple in the Murshidabad district. There is a legend that Nawab Mir Jafar in his death bed had requested for the holy Charanamrito (the holy water) of Maa Kiriteswari while suffering from leprosy.

Culture
According to David J. McCutchion the Kiriteswari Temple is a small shrine which is basically a char-chala, “but the curve of the cornice has been repeated as a pattern all the way up the roof (eight segments). He also mentions it as a char-chala with an ek-bangla porch.

Transport
The temple is located in Kiritkona village which is popularly known as Kiriteswari. Nabagram-Lalbag Road pass through the village. The nearest railway route is Dahapara Dham railway station (5 km from the village). Lalbag Court Road railway station is near about 3 km from the temple.

Kiriteswari Temple picture gallery

References

External links

External links

Hindu temples in West Bengal
Shakti Peethas
Hindu temples in Murshidabad district